Øystein Kvaal Østerbø (born 7 July 1981) is a Norwegian orienteering and ski-orienteering competitor. He finished overall third in the Orienteering World Cup in 2004, and won a silver medal in the relay in the 2004 World Ski Orienteering Championships. He has competed in all fifteen World Orienteering Championships since his debut in 2004 until 2018, obtaining his first two medals in Inverness in 2015; in the relay and mixed sprint relay, respectively. His best individual achievements are fourth places in the sprint in 2005 and 2010.

World cup, orienteering
Østerbø finished third overall at the 2004 Orienteering World Cup, with a total score of 207 points (same score as Russian Andrey Khramov who finished second). He was ranked 7th in the World Cup 2005.

European championships
He received a bronze medal in relay at the European Orienteering Championships in 2006 in Otepää.

In 2008 in Ventspils he made a small mistake that cost him the medal in the sprint distance, where he finished 8th but missed the bronze medal by only eleven seconds.

National championships
He became Norwegian champion in night orienteering in 2006.

Ski orienteering
Østerbø participated on the Norwegian team that received a silver medal at the World Ski Orienteering Championships in 2004, together with Anders Hauge, Eivind Tonna and Tommy Olsen. At this championship he finished 8th in the sprint distance and 6th in the middle distance.

References

External links
 
 

1981 births
Living people
Sportspeople from Trondheim
Norwegian orienteers
Male orienteers
Foot orienteers
Ski-orienteers
World Orienteering Championships medalists
World Games bronze medalists
Competitors at the 2009 World Games
World Games medalists in orienteering
21st-century Norwegian people
Competitors at the 2005 World Games